Al-Manar is a Lebanese satellite television station owned and operated by the political party Hezbollah, broadcasting from Beirut, Lebanon. The channel was launched on 4 June 1991 and it is a member of the Arab States Broadcasting Union.

Al-Manar was designated as a “Specially Designated Global Terrorist entity", and banned by the United States on 17 December 2004.

On 22 June 2021, the official Al-Manar website domain as well as dozens of other Arab news network domains related to Iran, Lebanon and Syria were shut down by the U.S. government for spreading disinformation and in cooperation with the U.S. government, Al-Manar is banned from multiple U.S based media platforms which include YouTube, Twitter, Instagram, Reddit etc.

It has also been banned by France Spain, and Germany, and has run into some service and license problems outside Lebanon, making it unavailable in the Netherlands, Canada, and Australia, while it has not officially been banned in any of these regions.

History
Al-Manar first began terrestrial broadcasting from Beirut, Lebanon on 4 June 1991. In 2000 the station also began broadcasting via satellite. The station was located in the predominantly Shi'a neighborhood of Haret Hreik in the southern suburbs of Beirut, where the Hezbollah is also headquartered. Originally, the station employed only a few men that had studied media in London during the mid-1980s. But almost a year later, Al-Manar was employing over 150 people.

Initially, Al Manar would broadcast only five hours per day. Shortly before the 1992 election, it began broadcasting regular news bulletins in order to help Hezbollah attain more votes and spread its message to more people. In 1993, the station expanded its broadcasting to seven hours a day and extended its signal to the southern part of the Bekaa Valley. Ahead of the 1996 Lebanese parliamentary elections, additional antennas were erected in Northern Lebanon and throughout the Mount Lebanon range, so that the station could be viewed not only in Lebanon, but also in western Syria and northern Israel. Broadcasting was extended to 20 hours in 1998 but reduced to 18 hours in 2000.

In 1996, the Lebanese government granted broadcasting licenses to only five television stations, not including Al-Manar. Approximately 50 stations were forced to close at the time. Several stations appealed the government's decision, but only four of them were finally granted licenses, one of which was Al-Manar. On 18 September, the Lebanese Cabinet decided to grant Al-Manar a license after having been requested to do so by then Syrian president Hafiz al-Asad. Al-Manar received the license in July 1997.

On 24/25 June 1999 the IAF launched two massive air raids across Lebanon. One of the targets was the al-Manar radio station’s offices in a four storey building in Baalbek which was completely demolished. The attacks also hit Beirut’s power stations and bridges on the roads to the south. An estimated $52 million damage was caused. Eleven Lebanese were killed as well as two Israelis in Kiryat Shmona. 

According to the US Department of Treasury, Al Manar is the media arm of the Hezbollah. The station manager Muhammad Afif Ahmad, said that Al Manar belongs to Hezbollah culturally and politically. By 2004, Al Manar was estimated to hold 10-15 million viewers daily worldwide.

Satellite broadcasting
During the 1990s, the popularity of satellite broadcasting greatly increased in the Arab world and in Lebanon. The first Lebanese station to use this technology was Future Television, launching Future International SAT in 1994, while LBCI and the Lebanese government followed by launching LBCSAT and Tele Liban Satellite respectively. In order to compete with these emerging stations, and in order to find an international audience, Al-Manar announced its intention to launch a satellite channel on 9 March 2000. Muhammad Ra'd, a Hezbollah member of parliament and al-Manar's largest shareholder, submitted the request to the minister of transmission, which was approved in April 2000. Although the launch of the satellite station was originally planned for July, the date was moved up in order to coincide with the end of the Israeli occupation of South Lebanon on 25 May. This success led other television stations to follow in launching satellite stations, including Murr TV in November 2000, but it was shut down for "violating an election law prohibiting propaganda" – a fate which al-Manar did not meet, although its programming was also considered propaganda by many analysts . ArabSat, a leading communications satellite operator in the Middle East, headquartered in Riyadh, Saudi Arabia, was at first wary about collaborating with al-Manar, because of the station's Shi'a agenda  – the two companies agreed, however, that the programming would be adapted to the pan-Arab audience, leading to a slight difference between the local broadcast and the one via satellite. At first, only three hours of satellite programming were broadcast per day, but by December 2000, the station was broadcasting around the clock.

Al-Manar was soon carried by many satellite providers. However, starting with the removal of the station from TARBS World TV in Australia in 2003, many satellite television providers stopped featuring it. Until then the station was featured by the following providers at one time or another:

Intelsat, broadcasting to North America
New Skies Satellites NSS-803, Africa and parts of Europe
ArabSat, Middle East, North Africa, and parts of Europe
Hispasat, South America
AsiaSat, Asia
Nilesat
Eutelsat, Europe, North Africa, and Middle East
SES Astra, Europe

According to the BBC on 26 July 2006, Al-Manar had three satellite signals:
 ArabSat 2B at 30.5 degrees east
 Badr 3 at 26 degrees east
 NileSat 102 at 7 degrees west

Al-Manar during 2006 Lebanon War

Israeli Air Force strike
The channel was continuously struck by missiles during Israeli air raids. The Israeli Air Force attacks on 13 July 2006 led to injury of three employees. The attack on Al-Manar's facilities shortly followed another strike against the Rafic Hariri International Airport in Beirut earlier that morning. Despite the attack, the station remained on air, broadcasting from undisclosed locations.

The IDF bombed Al-Manar's Beirut complex again on 16 July causing fire in the complex and surrounding buildings. The station's signal disappeared briefly several times, then continued normal programming.

Illegality of bombing
The bombing of media outlets violates international law when they are not being used for military purposes ("it is unlawful to attack facilities that merely shape civilian opinion; neither directly contributes to military operations"), according to Human Rights Watch.

This incident has been condemned by the International Federation of Journalists. The Israel Association of Journalists withdrew from the federation due to this criticism, claiming that Al-Manar employees "are not journalists, they are terrorists".

The New York based Committee to Protect Journalists, has also expressed alarm over the incident as "it (Al-Manar) does not appear based on a monitoring of its broadcasts today to be serving any discernible military function, according to CPJ’s analysis."

Content 

Al-Manar's programming consists of 25% music videos and fillers, 25% series and dramas, 25% talk shows, and finally 25% news and family shows. Most of the programming is self-produced, although on occasion, programming from IRIB (Iran) is used. The point-of-view of the programming is strongly anti-Israel and anti-US. "Appearing on al-Manar, Hezbollah Secretary General Hassan Nasrallah frequently calls for `Death to America`" and the Statue of Liberty is depicted "as a ghoul, her gown dripping blood, a knife instead of a torch in her raised hand."

Programs
The news programming includes much footage from the international press, especially the Israeli. Additionally the station subscribes to the following wire services: Reuters, Associated Press, Agence France Presse, and Deutsche Presse Agentur. It also sources stories from Iranian news agencies such as FARS and IRNA. The station airs eight news bulletins a day in Arabic in addition to one in English and one in French.

Several talk shows are regularly aired on al-Manar. The best known of these is Beit al-ankabut (The Spider's House); its title alludes to a metaphor, Hassan Nasrallah often employs to describe Israel. It is dedicated to uncovering the "weakness of the Zionist entity", i.e. Israel. It attempts to convince the Arab world that Israel could easily be destroyed, for example, by an increase in the Arab population and the implementation of the Palestinian right of return. Further talk shows include Hadith al-sa'a (Talk of the Hour), Matha ba'ad (What's Next?), Ma'al Hadath (With The Event), Bayna Kawsayn (Between The Brackets), Milafat (Files), Al-din wa al-hayat (Religion and Life), and Nun wa al-qalam (The 'Nun' and the Pen). Guests include well-known journalists, analysts, writers, Lebanese politicians, spokespersons of terrorist groups, and Islamic scholars, who then discuss current religious, political, and cultural, regional and global topics.

Al-Manar often airs music videos and fillers in between full-length programs and during commercial breaks. The music videos are generally dedicated to the following seven purposes: the promotion of the Hezbollah, highlighting the importance of armed resistance against Israel, the glorification of martyrdom, spreading of anti-Americanism, denunciation of Israel and Zionism as the embodiments of terrorism, the appeals for the destruction of Israel, and the depiction of the future of Arab youths. The videos are on average three minutes long. The videos are usually professionally produced by the station itself and each usually takes about three to four days to make. The filler material usually consists of appeals to donate money to the Hezbollah, lists of demonstrations taking place worldwide, and slogans in English, Hebrew, or Arabic.

The station also offers sports broadcasting - such as the programs Goal and Tis'in daqiqa (Ninety Minutes) -, family programming - such as Al-mustakshifoun al-judud (The New Explorers), Al-Muslimoun fi al-Sin (Muslims in China), and Ayday al-khayr (Hands of Benevolence) -, game shows - including Al-mushahid shahid (The Viewer Is the Witness), where contestants attempt to guess the names of Israeli political and military figures, and Al-muhima (The Mission) -, and even a children's program called Al-manr al-saghir (The Little Manar), which is in the style of the US show Mr. Rogers' Neighborhood, targeting three- to seven-year-olds. Al-Manar also broadcasts Iranian soap operas, dubbed into Modern Standard Arabic.

During Ramadan, al-Manar features special programs, many of which are self-produced. In 2001, Izz al-Din al-Qassam: Qisat al-jihad wa al-muqawama (Izz al-Din al-Qassam: A Story of Jihad and Resistance), a four-part drama based on the life of Izz al-Din al-Qassam, an early-twentieth-century Arab, after whom the Izz ad-Din al-Qassam Brigades are named. It was considered a success among Palestinians. The 2002 program Faris bi la jawad (A Knight without a Horse), which was produced by an Egyptian, was based on The Protocols of the Elders of Zion, an old Russian anti-Semitic text claiming a conspiracy of Jews control the world, like many programs of the station. The 29-part series Ash-Shatat (The Diaspora), which was aired in 2003, was also based on The Protocols and produced in Syria; it led to the banning of al-Manar in France.

Religion
Al-Manar was the first TV station to report Hezbollah's condemnation of the 11 September attacks. Other non-state attacks against the United States have also been condemned on Al-Manar, including the 2000 USS Cole bombing suicide attack against a US Navy destroyer.

Al-Manar was once described as one of the channels, among other complex reasons, of the spread of Shiism in Syria in the years before 2009.

Until the Israeli withdrawal from South Lebanon, Al-Manar's programming political focus was mainly against the Israeli presence in Lebanon. While the withdrawal in May 2000 left a void in the station's programming, Hezbollah and A-Manar consider the Shebaa Farms to be Lebanese territory occupied by Israel, and this became a focal point for political programming. In September of that year, the al-Aqsa Intifada broke out, and Al-Manar began to cover the issue of the Israeli–Palestinian conflict more extensively, overtly propagandizing to support the Palestinian militants.

Journalistic standards and neutrality 
According to Al Manar's news director, Hassan Fadlallah, Al Manar does not aim to be neutral in its broadcasting, "Neutrality like that of Al Jazeera is out of the question for us," Fadlallah said. "We cover only the victim, not the aggressor. CNN is the Zionist news network, Al Jazeera is neutral, and Al Manar takes the side of the Palestinians...He said Al Manar's opposition to neutrality means that, unlike Al Jazeera, his station would never feature interviews or comments by Israeli officials. "We're not looking to interview Sharon," Fadlallah said. "We want to get close to him in order to kill him."

Accusations and restrictions

Designation as a 'terrorist entity'
Al-Manar was placed on a US terrorist watchlist in December 2004. Reporters without Borders said that no evidence was presented of Al-Manar's involvement with terrorism. The main evidence provided for Al-Manar being anti-semitic was its partial showing, in October–November 2003, of the Syrian-produced 29-part series Ash-Shatat ("The Diaspora"). Lebanon's ambassador to the United States, Farid Abboud, protested: "If you want simply to demonize or eliminate one side, you're not going to advance the issue. If you are going to focus on one side simply because of the political message, it's unacceptable and it's a grave breach of the freedom of speech.".

In March 2006 Al-Manar was designated as a "Specially Designated Global Terrorist entity" by the United States, declaring it "owned or controlled by the Iran-funded Hezbollah terrorist network". As a result, Al-Manar was made subject to US sanctions.

Allegations of anti-Semitic programming
One of the satellite providers which has transmitted Al-Manar is the French satellite Hot Bird 4, owned by the Eutelsat Satellite organisation. On 13 December 2004, the French Conseil d'État, the highest administrative Court in France, ordered the French-based Eutelsat Company to shut down Al-Manar broadcasts following accusations that its programmes were anti-Semitic and could incite hatred.

Al-Manar claims the French decision was political and not legal, influenced by Israel and Jewish lobbies.

Banning of broadcasts
Al-Manar's broadcasts have been banned by the US, France, Spain, and Germany.

After the U.S. Department of State placed Al-Manar on the Terrorist Exclusion List on 17 December 2004, transmissions to North America via Intelsat's satellites were blocked. Javed Iqbal, a resident of New York City is the first person to charged under this law. Iqbal, 45, a Pakistani who had been living in the U.S. for more than 25 years, was charged by federal prosecutors with providing material support to a foreign terrorist organization by broadcasting Al Manar to U.S. customers, in exchange for thousands of dollars payment. In a 2008 plea bargain, he agreed to serve a prison term of up to  years. Saleh Elahwal, who also operates HDTV, was also charged and went on trial 5 January 2009. Donna Lieberman, executive director of the New York Civil Liberties Union, says it's constitutional for the government to outlaw businesses with direct operational ties to terrorist organizations, and media outlets that directly incite and direct violent action, but in this case, the government is trying to stop the spread of ideas. Mark Dubowitz, who founded the Coalition Against Terrorist Media to in part stop Al-Manar, said Al-Manar was shouting fire in a crowded theater, although Lieberman disagreed with that metaphor.

The Dutch Media Authority "discovered that a satellite owned by New Skies Satellites was carrying Al-Manar and has ordered the company to stop doing so, because the channel did not have the required Dutch licence." Many, including Radio Netherlands Worldwide Media Network consider this to be a ban. The Spanish authorities banned the retransmission of Al-Manar by Hispasat on 30 June 2005 (which effectively prevents its reception not only in the Iberian Peninsula but also in South America).

The lack of transmission from Intelsat had the effect of making Al-Manar unavailable in Canada, which some have interpreted as a "ban". While Al-Manar is not approved for distribution in Canada, there is no record of application for approval having been made.

TARBS World TV voluntarily stopped broadcasting al-Manar in Australia on 5 November 2003, 15 days into an investigation by the ABA regarding accusations of "broadcast programs that are likely to incite or perpetuate hatred against or gratuitously vilify any person or group on the basis of their ethnicity, nationality, race or religion". The report for this investigation was never finalised as TARBS had gone into receivership by that time. Al-Manar in August 2009 received approval for broadcast by Australian Communications and Media Authority.

Al-Manar provides a live feed of its programming on the Internet through its website. This effectively circumvents the bans as Al-Manar is still available in all the areas it does not broadcast to via satellite.

Broadcasting via illegal IPTV services and streaming devices 
According to a report by the security company NAGRA and the Digital Citizens Alliance, following an investigation into illegal IPTV services and illicit streaming devices, it indicated that 50% of these services include Al-Manar, making it available in countries where the channel has been banned due to links with Hezbollah.

On October 26, 2020, the Digital Citizens Alliance released a video warning of terrorist content that could include several of these illegal services, including Al-Manar.

Google and Apple applications
On 25 July 2012, Al Manar launched an application through Apple's iTunes app store, directing users to various content produced by the Hezbollah television station, including speeches by Hezbollah leader, Hassan Nasrallah.

However, the application was subsequently removed from iTunes and Google Play. Maha Abouelenein, Head of Communications for the Mena at Google, subsequently stated that "We remove applications that violate our policies, such as apps that are illegal or that promote hate speech" although she added that "We don’t comment on individual applications – however, you can check out our policies for more."

Al Manar TV subsequently blamed "Israeli incitement against Al Manar TV" as the reason Al-Manar mobile apps were removed by Apple and Google. An Al-Manar TV reporter stated that: "Al Manar TV is once again targeted by America and Israel. The removal of the channel's mobile apps from the Google and Apple stores is a new attempt to curb Al-Manar's message of resistance.

Al Manar TV Director-General Abdallah Qasir stated that the removal of the apps "indicates that Al Manar TV has the ability to cause great harm to Israel, and that Israel is extremely annoyed by Al Manar becoming so widespread and by its great credibility. Israel cannot even bear to see the Al-Manar icon on smartphones." Abd Al-Hadi Mahfouz, president of the Lebanese National Media Council, also supported Al-Manar, arguing that: "This move contradicts all laws pertaining to radio and television, to the exercising of media liberties, and to the right of citizens, Western and Arab alike, to information." Rabi' Al-Ba'lbaki, the head of the Lebanese IT Association reportedly called for a boycott of Apple and Google if they do not restore service for Al-Manar's applications.

In a statement issued on 16 August 2012, Al Manar says it is "back on Ipad and Iphone applications via alternative ways, following the campaign carried out by the Jewish Anti-Defamation League to deactivate Al-Manar applications on smart phones at Google Play and apple store". In an effort to avoid distributor policies and control, the new applications are downloadable directly from Al-Manar's website, which is hosted British server. The website also provides instructions, along with screen shots, on configuring Android phones to accept applications "not sourced in Android Market" and for installing the application on iPhones.

In March 2014, Al Manar relaunched their application in Apple's iTunes store under the name "LCG."

See also 
 al-Manar (for the early 20th century journal of the same name)
 Arab–Israeli conflict
 Mohammed Hassan Dbouk, accredited al-Manar journalist believed to have misused his credentials in support of Hezbollah militant activities
 Television in Lebanon
 Al-Ahed News
 Hezbollah
 Al-Manar Football Festival
 Al-Nour
 Hate media

Notes

Bibliography

Further reading
Tatham, Steve (2006), 'Losing Arab Hearts & Minds: The Coalition, Al-Jazeera & Muslim Public Opinion' Hurst & Co (London) Published 1 January.
Kilpert, Daniel. Tödliche Sendung in Jungle World 11 January 2006 ISSN 1613-0766
Jorisch, Avi Hezbollah Hate with a U.S. Link in Los Angeles Times, 13 October 2002.
IFEX. 'Israeli forces strike Al-Manar TV facilities, 14 July 2006.
 Kelly McEvers, Inside Manar, On the Media, National Public Radio, 26 January 2007
 M. Zuhdi Jasser. Al-Manar: Satellite Propaganda Network. Homeland Security Network. 17 October 2011

External links
 Al Manar official website in Arabic 
 Al Manar official website in English 
 Al Manar official website in French 
 Al Manar official website in Spanish 

Hezbollah propaganda organizations
1991 establishments in Lebanon
Television channels and stations established in 1991
Television stations in Lebanon
International broadcasters
Arab mass media
Arabic-language television stations
Propaganda television broadcasts
Mass media in Beirut
Islamic television networks